Cassava green mottle virus (CGMV) is a plant pathogenic virus of the family Secoviridae.

External links
ICTVdB—The Universal Virus Database: Cassava green mottle virus
Family Groups—The Baltimore Method

Viral plant pathogens and diseases
Nepoviruses